Sedjenane is a town in northern Tunisia, on the railway line to Mateur and the port of Bizerta. The Battle of Sedjenane was fought during World War II between the Allies and Axis for control of a town in northern Tunisia, on the railway line to Mateur and the port of Bizerta. The battle was part of the Tunisia Campaign.

First battle of Sedjenane, February–March 1943
The town became of strategic importance during the Allied invasion of North Africa in World War II. Following the initial landings of Operation Torch, the Allied run for Tunis was halted by German paratroops (operating in the ground role) in the hills east of the town in November 1942. British troops of the 8th Battalion, Argyll and Sutherland Highlanders, part of 36th Brigade of British 78th Division, were ambushed as they advanced on the road through the hills on November 29, 1942, and their wrecked Universal Carriers in No man's land became a grim symbol of the ensuing stalemate to Allied troops over the following several months of the Tunisia Campaign. These dominant hills, known to the Allies, as "Green Hill", "Baldy" and "Sugarloaf" were a barrier to further Allied advances in the north through to February 1943. Alan Moorehead a war correspondent wrote in African Trilogy (1944),

On February 26, 1943, the Germans broke the stalemate with Operation Ochsenkopf (Ox Head) offensive, a complementary blow to the Kasserine Pass offensive earlier that month. In a subsidiary operation Unternehmen Ausladung, the Axis attempted to outflank the British troops in Sedjenane and on the high ground opposite "Green Hill", with an attack on the hilly coastal strip to the north between the town and Cap Serrat, which was only lightly held by poorly-equipped French troops of the Corps Francs d'Afrique.

The German advance, led by Colonel Rudolf Witzig's Parachute Engineer Battalion, was held by a series of counter-attacks by the 16th Battalion, Durham Light Infantry, of 139th Brigade of British 46th Division, and two troops of No. 1 Commando on February 27, 1943, supported by the 70th Field and 5th Medium Regiments, Royal Artillery. 16 DLI mounted a further, disastrous counter-attack at dawn on March 2, 1943, in which it suffered severe casualties. That afternoon, the Germans also successfully advanced from the east towards Sedjenane and broke through the ranks of the 5th Battalion, Sherwood Foresters, also of 139th Brigade. According to Associated Press war correspondent Don Whitehead, an Italian infantry battalion (from the 10th Bersaglieri Regiment) supported by 30 tanks counterattacked in the British sector on 3 March, but lost half its strength killed to machine-gun fire.

The 6th Battalion, Lincolnshire Regiment, of 138th Brigade of 46th Division, several Churchill tanks of the North Irish Horse, of 25th Army Tank Brigade, plus elements of No. 1 Commando and 16 DLI were involved in the defence of the town, which finally fell to the Germans and Italians on March 4.

Second battle of Sedjenane, April–May 1943
The town was retaken by the Allies on April 1, 1943. The several Allied counter-attacks through March 1943, to first stem the German advance and then to retake Sedjenane, represented the first time that British and German parachute troops had fought each other. The use of the term 'Red Devil' to describe a British paratrooper reputedly has its origins in these engagements, fought by men of the 1st Parachute Brigade.

American forces took over the positions in the Sedjenane area and in front of 'Green Hill' on April 12, 1943, through to the conclusion of the North African Campaign in May 1943.

U.S. Army Sergeant William L Nelson, H Company, 2nd Battalion, 60th Infantry Regiment, U.S. 9th Infantry Division, was posthumously awarded the Medal of Honor for his actions at Djebel Dardys, northwest of Sedjenane, on April 24, 1943. The 2nd Battalion, 60th infantry Regiment also received a Presidential Unit Citation for its actions on April 23 and 24.

Footnotes

References

 
 The Story of 46 Division, p 24
 The DLI at War, by David Rissik, Brancepeth 1952
 The Story of 46 Division 1939–45, published by the Division, Austria, 1946
 The History of the Sixteenth Battalion The Durham Light Infantry, by Lawrence Stringer, 1946
 The Birth of an Army by A B Austin, 1943
 Over to Tunis The Complete Story of the North African Campaign, by Howard Marshall, 1943
 The Red Beret by Hilary St George Saunders, 1950
 The Green Beret by Hilary St George Saunders, 1949
 Green Devils German Paratroopers 1939–45 by Jean-Yves Nasse, Paris, 1997
 To Bizerte With the II Corps Historical Division, War Department, American Forces in Action, 1943. Reprinted 1990
 Sedjenane The Pay-Off Battle Leading to the Capture of Bizerte, Tunisia by the 9th US Infantry Division, May 9, 1943, by Henry Gerard Phillips, 1993,

External links
 The 16th Battalion Durham Light Infantry at Sedjenane
 The 70th Field Regiment Royal Artillery at Sedjenane, the eyewitness account of Major Harry Craggs MC
 An obituary for Major Robert Thorman MC, who was awarded the Military Cross for his actions with the 6th Battalion, the Lincolnshire Regiment on March 4th 1943
 William L Nelson Medal of Honor
 Battle Report of the North Irish Horse at Sedjenane
 Photographs of several Churchill tanks which fell into Axis hands at Sedjenane in March 1943
 Battle of Sedjenane, April 1943, 39th Infantry Regiment

Sedjenane
1943 in Tunisia
North African campaign
Tunisian campaign
Sedjenane
Sedjenane
Sedjenane